is a former Japanese football player and manager. He played for Japan national team. He is the first Japanese player to score in J1 League. His two sons Koki Kazama and Koya Kazama are also football players.

Club career
Kazama was born in Shizuoka on October 16, 1961. After graduating from University of Tsukuba, he moved to Germany in 1984. He played for several clubs, including Remscheid and Eintracht Braunschweig. In 1989, he returned to Japan and joined Japan Soccer League Division 2 club Mazda (later Sanfrecce Hiroshima). The club was promoted to Division 1 in 1991. In 1992, Japan Soccer League was folded and founded new league J1 League. J1 League first season in 1993, he played opening match and scored a goal. This is the first goal by Japanese player in J1 League. He left Sanfrecce Hiroshima end of 1995 season and moved to Germany club Remscheid again. He retired in 1998.

National team career
In August 1979, when Kazama was a Shimizu Commercial High School student, he was selected Japan U-20 national team for 1979 World Youth Championship and he played 3 games. In December 1980, when he was a University of Tsukuba student, he was selected Japan national team for 1982 World Cup qualification. At this qualification, on December 22, he debuted against Singapore. He also played at 1982 Asian Games and 1984 Summer Olympics qualification. He played 19 games for Japan until 1983. After he moved to Germany in 1984, he was not selected Japan.

Coaching career
After retirement, Kazama became a manager for Toin University of Yokohama in 1998. He resigned in 2003. In 2008, he became a manager for his alma mater University of Tsukuba and managed until April 2012.

On April 23, 2012, Kawasaki Frontale announce appointment of their new manager Kazama. The former Sanfrecce Hiroshima and national team player begins his first professional managerial stint two weeks after the firing of former boss Naoki Soma for poor results. Kazama led the club to won the 3rd place 2 times (2013 and 2016) and 2nd place 2016 Emperor's Cup. He resigned in end of 2016 season.

In 2017, Kazama moved to J2 League club Nagoya Grampus. He led the club to a 3rd place finish at the end of the season and hence gained promotion to 2018 J1 League. In 2018 season, although Grampus results were bad, Grampus finished at the 15th place and remained in J1. On 23 September 2019, it was announced Kazama would be leaving Grampus after an underwhelming season.

Club statistics

National team statistics

Managerial statistics

References

External links
 
 
 Japan National Football Team Database
 
 

1961 births
Living people
University of Tsukuba alumni
Association football people from Shizuoka Prefecture
Japanese footballers
Japan youth international footballers
Japan international footballers
Japanese expatriate footballers
Japanese expatriate sportspeople in Germany
Expatriate footballers in Germany
2. Bundesliga players
Japan Soccer League players
J1 League players
Bayer 04 Leverkusen II players
VfB Remscheid players
Eintracht Braunschweig players
Sanfrecce Hiroshima players
Japanese football managers
J1 League managers
J2 League managers
Kawasaki Frontale managers
Nagoya Grampus managers
Footballers at the 1982 Asian Games
Association football midfielders
Asian Games competitors for Japan